Gilson Pereira do Espirito Santo (born 25 October 1991), simply known as Gilson, is a São Toméan footballer who plays as a defender for FC Porto Real and the São Tomé and Príncipe national team.

International career
Gilson made his international debut for São Tomé and Príncipe in 2015.

References

1991 births
Living people
Association football defenders
São Tomé and Príncipe footballers
São Tomé and Príncipe international footballers